"L8 CMMR" (pronounced latecomer), is a song by British recording artist Lily Allen from her third studio album, Sheezus (2014). It premiered online on 6 February 2014, the same day as the release of her previous single "Air Balloon" music video.

Composition
This track follows the style of her previous single, "Air Balloon", and is a bubblegum pop and electropop song. The song also features heavy amounts of autotune, as well as chipper synths. Described as a 'no brainer (song)' by Allen herself, the song describes her love to a man, whom nobody can ever steal away from her.

Release
The song was included in Girls Volume 2: All Adventurous Women Do, the soundtrack of the second series of the HBO series Girls.

Lyric video
On 17 February 2014, an official lyric video of the song was released on her official YouTube channel. The lyric video features a retrogaming-inspired video. The video shows Allen as a character of a 1980s video game, who needs to fight and overcome obstacles, like racing, in order to win prizes like engagement rings. The video received critical acclaim and was a fan favorite as the video was fun and different from mainstream videos.

Reception
The song received generally positive reviews from music critics. Spin gave a positive review of the song, calling it a "bright, bouncy electro-pop with well-crafted hooks and some playful Auto-Tune effects", but also stated it was a "little lackluster". In May 2014, the song debuted at number 61 on the Flanders Ultratip chart, and later reached number 4.

Chart positions

References

2014 songs
Lily Allen songs
Songs written by Lily Allen